The Cordele Dispatch is a twice-weekly newspaper published in Cordele, Georgia. It is operated by Boone Newspapers Inc. Boone acquired the paper in August 2015 from CNHI.

References

External links 
 Dispatch Website
 Boone Newspapers Website

Cordele
Cordele Dispatch